The 1985 Australian Football Championships was an Australian rules football series between representative teams of the three major football states. Games involving Victoria were played under State of Origin rules, whilst the match between Western Australia and South Australia involved players based in their respective states at the time. The competition drew controversy when the result of the game between Victoria and South Australia, originally a 57 point win to Victoria, was overturned and awarded to South Australia as a result of Victoria fielding too many players when coach Kevin Sheedy snuck Shane Heard into the squad and into the team as an extra player. The competition was won by South Australia, and it was their first Australian championship since 1911.

Results

Game 1 

|- style="background:#ccf;"
| Home team
| Home team score
| Away team
| Away team score
| Ground
| Crowd
| Date
| Time
| Broadcast Network
|- style="background:#fff;"
| South Australia
| 11.10 (76)
| Victoria
| 20.13 (133)
| Football Park
| 44,287
| 14 May 1985 
| 8:00pm
| Seven

 Match awarded to South Australia at a National Football League appeal hearing on 16 June 1985. Victoria forfeited the match but retained the percentage in relation to points scored for and against.
 Fos Williams Medal: Peter Motley (South Australia)

Game 2 

|- style="background:#ccf;"
| Home team
| Home team score
| Away team
| Away team score
| Ground
| Crowd
| Date
| Time
| Broadcast Network
|- style="background:#fff;"
| South Australia
| 30.18 (198)
| Western Australia
| 16.15 (111)
| Subiaco Oval
|
| 15 June 1985 
|
|

 Fos Williams Medal: Craig Bradley (South Australia)
 Simpson Medal: Craig Bradley(South Australia)

Game 3 

|- style="background:#ccf;"
| Home team
| Home team score
| Away team
| Away team score
| Ground
| Crowd
| Date
| Time
| Broadcast Network
|- style="background:#fff;"
| Victoria
| 19.16 (130)
| Western Australia
| 9.11 (65)
| Subiaco Oval
| 38,000
| 16 July 1985 
|
|

 Simpson Medal: Dale Weightman (Victoria)
 E. J. Whitten Medal: Paul Roos (Victoria)
 Tassie Medal: Dale Weightman (Victoria)

Standings

All-Australian Team 
Following completion of the series, the best players over the three games were selected in the All-Australian team.

Squads

References 

Australian rules interstate football
1985 in Australian rules football